István Horváth (born February 28, 1970) is a Hungarian agrarian engineer and politician, member of the National Assembly (MP) from Tolna County Regional List from 2006 to 2010. He represents Szekszárd (Tolna County Constituency I) since May 14, 2010.

Career
He joined Fidesz in 1996. He became a representative in the Szekszárd Assembly in 1998. Four years later, he could repeat his success. He served as leader of the party's Szekszárd branch between 2002 and 2005.

He was elected to the member of the National Assembly during the 2006 parliamentary election. He was a member of the Committee on Local Government and Regional Development from May 30, 2006, to May 13, 2010. Few months later he was elected mayor of his birthplace in the 2006 local elections, succeeding Imre Antal Kocsis. He served as mayor until the 2014 local elections, replaced by fellow Fidesz member Rezső Ács. Horváth was a member of the Parliamentary Committee on Agriculture from 2010 to 2017.

In May 2013, a leaked audio recording from Szekszárd, surfaced by fellow Fidesz member Ákos Hadházy (who later joined Politics Can Be Different) proved that the ruling right-wing government gave tobacco-sale rights based on party links following the adoption of the controversial law. The Heti Világgazdaság quoted István Horváth who said the most important is that "applicants should be committed conservatives" and the "Socialist supporters must not win".

Horváth was appointed Secretary of State for Coordinating the Development of Town with County Rights under minister without portfolio Lajos Kósa in October 2017. He served in this capacity until May 2018. Thereafter he became a member of the Committee on Budgets.

Personal life
He is married. His wife is Anica Nestorovic. They have a daughter, Orsolya and two sons, István and Balázs.

References

1970 births
Living people
Fidesz politicians
Members of the National Assembly of Hungary (2006–2010)
Members of the National Assembly of Hungary (2010–2014)
Members of the National Assembly of Hungary (2014–2018)
Members of the National Assembly of Hungary (2018–2022)
Members of the National Assembly of Hungary (2022–2026)
Mayors of places in Hungary
People from Szekszárd